Justøy Chapel is a chapel of the Church of Norway in Lillesand Municipality in Agder county, Norway. It is located just north of the village of Brekkestø on the island of Justøya. It is an annex chapel in the Lillesand parish which is part of the Vest-Nedenes prosti (deanery) in the Diocese of Agder og Telemark. The white, wooden chapel was built in a long church style in 1884 using designs by an unknown architect. The chapel seats about 150 people.

History
The building was constructed in 1884 as a prayer house on a plot of land donated by John Berge. The prayer house was consecrated on 22 November 1884. In 1902, the prayer house was converted into a chapel. The entrance was moved to the east wall and a small tower on the roof was added. An architect named Holst led the renovations. The building was consecrated as an official chapel on 15 August 1902 by the Bishop Johan Christian Heuch. In 1923, an entry porch was added to the building. In 1962, the tower was rebuilt. In 1984, the old entry porch was torn down and replaced with a new entry porch.

Media gallery

See also
List of churches in Agder og Telemark

References

Lillesand
Churches in Agder
Wooden churches in Norway
19th-century Church of Norway church buildings
Churches completed in 1884
1884 establishments in Norway